Wylie Human (born 26 February 1979) is a South African rugby union winger. He has played for several Super Rugby teams including the Stormers, the Sharks and the Lions. He has also played for Bath and Northampton Saints, and is currently plying his trade with French second division side Pays d'Aix Rugby Club Le PARC.

References

External links
 South Africa rugby profile
 Wylie Human becomes a Cat again

1979 births
Living people
South African rugby union players
Stormers players
Western Province (rugby union) players
Golden Lions players
Lions (United Rugby Championship) players
Rugby union wings
Bath Rugby players
Northampton Saints players
Sharks (rugby union) players
Bulls (rugby union) players
Blue Bulls players
South African expatriate rugby union players
Expatriate rugby union players in England
South African expatriate sportspeople in England
South Africa international rugby sevens players
Provence Rugby players
Expatriate rugby union players in France
South African expatriate sportspeople in France